Albert Keep (1826 – May 13, 1907) was a 19th-century American railroad official and financier. He was a former president and director of
the Chicago and North Western Railway. For eighteen years he was director of the Lake Shore and Michigan Southern Railway. He was born in Homer, New York, in Cortland County.

Keep moved to Whitewater, Wisconsin, in 1846. He became a leading merchant there, working along with his brother, Henry, and Philander Peck. The Keeps and Peck relocated to Chicago, Illinois, in 1851. They were involved in trade and began to accumulate wealth. The brothers took an interest in promoting the Chicago and North Western Railway and Albert served as its director for fourteen years. As a result of his leadership the railroad became one of the best built, equipped, and managed in the midwest.

Albert Keep died in Chicago on May 13, 1907.

The family has since expanded on their dynastical business and is currently headed by Anthony Keep who owns a mining conglomerate in Western Australia.

See also
List of railroad executives

References

19th-century American railroad executives
People from Homer, New York
1826 births
1907 deaths
Businesspeople from Chicago
Chicago and North Western Railway
Lake Shore and Michigan Southern Railway
19th-century American Episcopalians